This is a list of the 99 members of the European Parliament for Germany in the 2004 to 2009 session.

List

Party representation

Footnotes

Germany
List
2004